The Virginia Tech College of Engineering is the academic unit that manages engineering research and education at Virginia Tech. The College can trace its origins to 1872, and was formally established in 1903. Today, The College of Engineering is the largest academic unit of Virginia Tech and has 14 departments of study. Its undergraduate program was ranked 4th and its graduate program was ranked 30th among doctoral-granting universities by U.S. News & World Report in 2018. In 2014–15, the College of Engineering consisted of 10,059 students. The current dean is Dr. Julia Ross.

History
Engineering courses have been available since the inception of Virginia Tech in 1872 when a student could follow the "Mechanical" course of study which included mechanical drawing, mechanical engineering, machinery, and steam engines. When the first administrative instructional divisions were established in 1903–04, engineering was one of four academic departments for which a dean was appointed. In 1920–21, it became the School of Engineering and then, in 1964, the College of Engineering.

Departments 

 Aerospace and Ocean Engineering
 Biological Systems Engineering
 Biomedical Engineering and Mechanics
 Chemical Engineering
 Civil and Environmental Engineering
 Computer Science
 Electrical and Computer Engineering
 Engineering Education
 Industrial and Systems Engineering
 Materials Science and Engineering
 Mechanical Engineering
 Mining and Minerals Engineering
 Myers-Lawson School of Construction
 School of Biomedical Engineering & Sciences

Undergraduate programs

The Department of Engineering Education is home to all first-year and transfer engineering students.

Rankings

Virginia Tech has a highly reputed undergraduate engineering school and is one of a handful of core recruiting schools for some of the world's most selective firms. Listed below are rankings by the U.S. News & World Report for undergraduate programs:
The overall Undergraduate Program ranks No. 14 overall and No. 7 among the public institutions according to U.S. News & World Report.
Undergraduate Engineering Science and Mechanics programs ranked No. 4 overall.
Undergraduate Industrial and Systems Engineering programs ranked No. 5 overall.

Graduate programs

Virginia Tech College of Engineering Graduate Students may choose from 16 Doctoral and 19 Masters programs available in 17 areas of study.

Rankings

Virginia Tech has a highly reputed Graduate Engineering Programs and is one of a handful of core recruiting schools for some of the world's most selective firms. Listed below are rankings by the U.S. News & World Report for the graduate programs:

The Graduate program ranks No. 21 overall and No. 11 among the public institutions according to U.S. News & World Report.
The Graduate Biological / Agricultural Engineering programs ranked No. 7 overall.
The Graduate Industrial / Manufacturing / Systems Engineering programs ranked No. 7 overall.
The Graduate Civil Engineering programs ranked No. 9 overall.
The Online Graduate Engineering Programs ranked No. 15 overall.
The Graduate Computer Engineering Program ranked No. 17 overall.

Master of Information Technology Program
The Graduate Program in Information Technology (VT-MIT) is a combined degree program offered collaboratively by Virginia Tech's College of Engineering, and the Pamplin College of Business. Virginia Tech's Master of Information Technology program was created in 2000 to meet needs of students. The program puts the student in touch with the latest developments in information technology, and the student body is highly accomplished and diverse. The program provides courses that are interdisciplinary, online, and currently has over 420 students enrolled in the United States and several other countries. The College of Engineering and the Pamplin College of Business jointly deliver the master of information technology program, which is accredited by the Southern Association of Colleges and Schools.

Courses in the program are taught by a dedicated group of senior level faculty using a state of the art technology where students from several states in the United States, along with those from many foreign nations participate online in this program. In 2014 the U.S. News & World Report ranked this program 2nd overall. 30 credits hours of coursework are required for the degree. Each student selects must complete three modules, for a total of 18 credit-hours, as well at the 12 credit-hour block of foundation courses in Java, Software Engineering, Computer Systems fundamentals, and Strategic IT Leadership. Admission requirements include a bachelor's degree or its equivalent from an accredited institution, essays, letters of recommendation, a GMAT or GRE score and a TOEFL or PTE score for international applicants.

MIT/MBA Dual Degree
In addition to the Master in Information Technology (M.I.T.) degree, Virginia Tech offers a joint M.I.T./M.B.A. program for students within the Virginia Tech National Capital Region. Students are able to pursue this unique dual degree in information technology and business administration via a sequential degree offering. The dual degree allows for the student to save time and requires 66 credit hours/22 courses for both degrees.

Additional Locations & Online Options

National Capital Region

In 1969 the university launched new locations within the Virginia Tech National Capital Region (NCR). These facilities serves as a hub in the Washington metropolitan area for its students and alumni. As of 2015, the NCR offers Graduate Engineering Programs in Computer Engineering, Civil Engineering, Computer Science & Applications, Electrical Engineering, Environmental Engineering, Environmental Sciences & Engineering, Industrial & Systems Engineering, and Mechanical Engineering.

Innovation Campus

In 2018, Virginia Tech unveiled its plans to construct a new 1 million square foot campus in the Northern Virginia area. The news came with the announcement of Amazon's plans to construct their National Landing HQ2 in the Pentagon City and Crystal City areas of Arlington County, with Virginia Tech's new campus being a key factor in attracting them. The new Campus is a jointly funded effort between the state and the University and its corporate donors, with an estimated cost of 1 billion dollars. It will have a focus on creating a pipeline for students in graduate degree programs related to computer technology. Virginia Tech, along with other state schools, has been tasked with increasing its pool of technology graduates. It must graduate approximately 10 thousand graduates and 6 thousand undergraduates in Computer related degrees by 2040 to receive its full state endowment. As of Fall 2019, Virginia Tech has opened applications for its first cohort in the Master of Engineering in Computer Science to begin in Spring 2020. Future plans are to house other computer-related graduate degrees, such as the M.A. in Data Analysis, the M.Eng. Electrical and Computer Engineering, and the M.I.T. programs, at the Innovation Campus at Potomac Yards, Alexandria as the building continues and the campus expands.

Hampton Roads
As of 2015, the Hampton Roads location offers Graduate Engineering Programs in Computer Engineering, Civil Engineering, Electrical Engineering, Industrial & Systems Engineering, and Mechanical Engineering.

Southwest Virginia & Richmond
As of 2015, the Southwest Virginia and Richmond Locations offers Graduate Engineering Programs in Computer Engineering, Civil Engineering, Electrical Engineering, and Industrial & Systems Engineering.

Online engineering degree options
As of 2015, the College of Engineering started to offer online Graduate Engineering Programs in Aerospace Engineering, Computer Engineering, Electrical Engineering, Environmental Sciences & Engineering, Information Technology, and Ocean Engineering.

Research
Virginia Tech's College of Engineering is classified as a "Research University (very high research activity)," by the Carnegie Foundation and is engaged in some of the most important engineering research and cross-disciplinary research conducted in the nation. By The Numbers for the college: 
$214,485,000 was spent on engineering research in FY2013.
43% of all research spending at Virginia Tech is engineering related.

Centers, Institutes, and Laboratories
Listed are the Centers and Laboratories associated with the College of Engineering:

Alumni association

The Virginia Tech College of Engineering Alumni Association is an alumni organization for former students of the college. Students have numerous opportunities to meet corporate executives and to network with the college's alumni base, many of whom are renowned engineering leaders. In addition the college has nearly 60,000 alumni.

See also

Virginia Polytechnic Institute and State University
List of engineering schools in the United States
Virginia Tech's Main Campus in Blacksburg

References

External links
 

Virginia Tech
Engineering schools and colleges in the United States
Engineering universities and colleges in Virginia